Frank Riley (1915–1996) was the pseudonym of Frank Rhylick, an American science fiction author best known for co-writing (with Mark Clifton) the novel They'd Rather Be Right, which won a Hugo Award for Best Novel during 1955. He was a syndicated travel columnist and editor for the Los Angeles Times, and editor of the Los Angeles Magazine. He also wrote advertisements for See's Candies, screenplays, short fiction such as the "Father Anton Dymek" mysteries and was a host of a radio program in the Los Angeles area.

References
The Encyclopedia of Science Fiction, page 1009

External links
 
 
 
 Frank Riley obituary, Los Angeles Times, April 30, 1996

20th-century American novelists
American male novelists
American science fiction writers
1915 births
1996 deaths
Hugo Award-winning writers
American male short story writers
20th-century American short story writers
20th-century American male writers